The Cuba was a steamship owned by the Pacific Mail Steamship Company. Originally launched in 1897 as the German SS Coblenz, she was seized by the United States in 1917, and named SS Sachem, until Pacific Mail purchased her from the Shipping Board on February 6, 1920, for US$400,000 and renamed SS Cuba.

Pacific Mail first used the Cuba to carry passengers and cargo between San Francisco, California, and Havana, Cuba, then shifted to a San Francisco-to-Cristobal route.

On the morning of September 8, 1923,
The ship's radio was out. She had been navigating through a dense fog for several days. Cuba struck a reef just off San Miguel Island in the Santa Barbara Channel off Point Arguello of Santa Barbara County, California. The Cuba was a total loss.

References

Sources

External links 

Channel Islands National Marine Sanctuary: Maritime Heritage 

Maritime incidents in 1923
History of Santa Barbara County, California
Ships built in Hamburg
Steamships of Germany
Ships of Norddeutscher Lloyd
Shipwrecks of the California coast
Steamships of the United States
World War I merchant ships of Germany
World War I merchant ships of the United States
1897 ships